Keumalahayati, or Malahayati (fl. 16th century), was an admiral of the Aceh Sultanate navy, which ruled the area of modern Aceh Province, Sumatra, Indonesia. She was the first woman admiral in the modern world (if Artemisia I is not included). Her troops were drawn from Aceh's widows and the army named the "Inong Balee", after the Inong Balee Fortress near the city of Banda Aceh. Some historians rate Keumalahayati as an equal of Semiramis and Catherine the Great, while references to her can be found in some Chinese and Western literature.

History

Malahayati was a daughter of Admiral Machmud Syah of the Aceh Empire. After graduating from Pesantren, an Islamic school, she continued her studies at the Aceh Royal Military Academy, known as Ma’had Baitul Maqdis.

Following the fall of Malacca to Portuguese invaders, Aceh became a stronger faction and ensured that merchant shipping routes in the Malacca Strait remained exclusively for Asian traders. The kingdom's leader, Sultan Alauddin Mansur Syah strengthened his military power by building a powerful navy to which he decided to appoint Malahayati, a widowed Aceh warrior, as his First Admiral. Aceh soldiers and the other generals had always respected Malahayati. She had also proved herself a legendary commander during several battles with the Portuguese and Dutch.

In 1599, Dutch expedition commander Cornelis de Houtman arrived at the port of Aceh. The Sultan accepted him peacefully until de Houtman insulted him. The Dutchman, who had already clashed with the Banten Sultanate in northwest Java before his arrival in Aceh, decided to attack. Malahayati led her Inong Balee Army in response to the Dutch challenge and after several violent battles, finally killed de Houtman on September 11, 1599.

In 1600, the Dutch Navy, led by Paulus van Caerden, robbed an Aceh merchant ship of its pepper off the Aceh coast. After this incident, In June 1601, Malahayati ordered the arrest of Dutch Admiral Jacob van Neck. After many incidents which blocked Dutch Navy expeditions and the threat from the Spanish fleet, Maurits van Oranje sent emissaries with diplomatic letter of apology to the Empire of Aceh. The emissaries were Admiral Laurens Bicker and Gerard de Roy. In August 1601, Malahayati met Maurits's emissaries for a treaty agreement. A ceasefire was agreed and the Dutch paid 50 thousand gulden as compensation for Paulus van Caerden's actions, while Malahayati released Dutch prisoners. After the agreement, the Sultan sent three emissaries to the Netherlands.

In June 1602, Malahayati's reputation as the guardian of the Aceh Kingdom led England to choose a peaceful, diplomatic method by which to enter the Malacca Strait. A letter from Queen Elizabeth I was brought by James Lancaster to the Sultan, and it was Malahayati who led the negotiation with Lancaster. The agreement opened the English route to Java, and they were soon afterwards able to build merchant offices in Banten. Elizabeth I rewarded Lancaster with a knighthood for his successful diplomacy in Aceh and Banten.

Malahayati was killed in combat while attacking the Portuguese fleet at Teuluk Krueng Raya. She was buried at lereng Bukit Kota Dalam, a small fishing village 34 km from Banda Aceh.

Legacy 
Today, Malahayati has had universities, hospitals and roads in several Sumatran cities as well as the naval ship KRI Malahayati, named after her. A naval port near her grave is also dubbed Malahayati Port.

In November 2017, President Joko Widodo awarded her the honorary National Hero of Indonesia.

In popular media 
In Destiny (video game), Malahayati was a submind of the Warmind Rasputin, one of the vast machine intelligences built during the Golden Age.

References

History of Aceh
Acehnese people
Warriors of Asia
Women in war in Indonesia
Women in 16th-century warfare
16th-century Indonesian women
Female admirals